The ladies' single skating competition of the 2010 Winter Olympics was held at the Pacific Coliseum in Vancouver, British Columbia, Canada. The short program was held on February 23, 2010 and the free skating was held on February 25, 2010. Yuna Kim from South Korea won the gold medal setting three world best scores. Mao Asada from Japan became the first lady to accomplish one triple Axel during the short program and two during the free program at the Olympics.

Records

Scores

Results

Short program 
The ladies' short program was held on February 23, 2010. Yuna Kim (South Korea) finished first with a new world best score. Mao Asada (Japan) finished second. Joannie Rochette (Canada) skated in the competition despite the tragedy of her mother's death two days earlier and finished third.

 TSS = Total Segment Score; TES = Technical Element Score; PCS = Program Component Score; SS = Skating Skills; TR = Transitions; PE = Performance/Execution; CH = Choreography; IN = Interpretation; Ded = Deduction; StN = Starting Number

Free skating 
The ladies free skate was held on February 25, 2010. Kim Yuna (South Korea) finished first, setting new world best scores for the free skate and combined total.

 TSS = Total Segment Score; TES = Technical Element Score; PCS = Program Component Score; SS = Skating Skills; TR = Transitions; PE = Performance/Execution; CH = Choreography; IN = Interpretation; Ded = Deduction; StN = Starting Number

Overall 

 SP = Short program; FS = Free skating

Judges and officials 
Referee:
 Elisabeth Louesdon

Technical Controller:
 Alexander Lakernik

Technical Specialist:
 Miriam Loriol-Oberwiler

Assistant Technical Specialist:
 Zuzana Zackova

Judges (SP):
 Allan Boehm
 Chihee Rhee
 Deborah Currie
 Claudia Fassora
 Julia Andreeva
 Mieko Fujimori
 Helene Cucuphat
 Dagmar Lurz-Prott
 Suzanne Lindsey

Judges (FS):
 Claudia Fassora
 Cynthia Benson
 Leena Kurri
 Helene Cucuphat
 Helmut Sieber
 Allan Boehm
 Chihee Rhee
 Maria Miller
 Dagmar Lurz-Prott

References

Citations

External links 
 2010 Winter Olympics results: Short program, from https://web.archive.org/web/20100222080013/http://www.vancouver2010.com/ retrieved February 24, 2010.
 2010 Winter Olympics results: Free skating, from https://web.archive.org/web/20100222080013/http://www.vancouver2010.com/ retrieved February 24, 2010.
 Vancouver 2010: Figure Skating 
 

Ladies
Women's events at the 2010 Winter Olympics
Oly